The Buckingham Curling Club (French: Club de curling Buckingham) is an historic curling club located in Buckingham, Quebec. It is the only curling club located within the city limits of Gatineau.

The Royal Caledonian Curling Club (the mother body of the sport) indicates that a curling club existed in Buckingham as late as 1857. This first version of the Buckingham curling club ceased operations in 1867. 

The second version of the club was opened in 1894 by the Whaleback Skating Rink, but closed a few years later. 

The third and final incarnation of the Buckingham Curling Club was opened in 1919 when a curling rink was built. 

In 1947, artificial ice was installed at the club. In 1952, the club switched from iron stones (used only in Quebec and Eastern Ontario) to granite rocks. In 1958, the current rink was built. 

Buckingham has only two sheets of ice. Buckingham maintains an historical rivalry with the Ottawa Curling Club. Each year, the two clubs participate in the Currier Cup, North America's second oldest sporting trophy (after the America's Cup). The cup has been played off and on since 1866.

Brier representatives
1989: Pierre Charette
1992: Ted Butler
1993: Pierre Charette
1996: Pierre Charette
1997: Pierre Charette

Tournament of Hearts representatives
1983: Agnès Charette
1984: Agnès Charette
1989: Agnès Charette
1992: Agnès Charette
1993: Agnès Charette
1994: Agnès Charette
1997: Chantal Osborne

External links
Official site

Curling clubs in Canada
Sport in Gatineau
Sports clubs established in 1919
1919 establishments in Quebec